Mari Jürjens, née Mari Pokinen (born 27 May 1988), is an Estonian actress and singer.

She graduated from the University of Tartu Viljandi Culture Academy in 2011 as a professional actress, and joined the Von Krahl Theatre in Tallinn.

In 2010, Jürjens debuted with the 11-track album 22 and released a second album, "Maa saab taevani", in 2013. Accordingly, the public recognises her as a singer rather than actress.  Her best-recognised role so far has been an appearance in the Estonian crime series Kättemaksukontor.

Life and music career 

Mari Jürjens was born in Tartu in 1988. After Mari, her parents had two more daughters. She lived with her family in Põlva until age 6, when they moved to Ülenurme, closer to the city, where her parents still live.

She began studying at Ülenurme Gymnasium in 1995, graduating in 2004. Then she attended Tartu Mart Reiniku Gümnaasium, graduating in 2007. That year she started studying to become a professional actress at the University of Tartu Viljandi Culture Academy, graduating in the summer of 2011.

Jürjens has also received a musical education. In 2003 she attended Ülenurme Muusikakool, where she studied violin. She has sung in a number of choirs, spending the longest time with the Estonian Youth Mixed Choir. Jürjens also has participated in singing competitions; in 2004 she won second place in the Võruvisioon competition with the song Olematu sina.  Since then, Jürjens has been writing more songs, starting with her 2010 debut album "22", and releasing a second album "Maa saab taevani" in 2013. Her song "Kord saan" include in the film Kertu released in 2013. In addition, she has participated in violin competitions.

She currently resides in Tallinn.

Personal life 
Mari Jürjens is married to actor Mikk Jürjens. She gave birth to twin boys in July 2014 and a son in 2017.

Discography

Studio albums

Filmography

References

External links 
 Mari Jürjens' homepage

1988 births
Living people
Estonian television actresses
Estonian stage actresses
Estonian musical theatre actresses
21st-century Estonian women singers
Actresses from Tartu
Musicians from Tartu
University of Tartu alumni
21st-century Estonian actresses